The following highways are numbered 830:

Hungary
 Main road 830 (Hungary)

United States